Parveen Amanullah is an Indian social activist turned politician. She is a member of the Aam Aadmi Party and had unsuccessfully contested the 2014 Indian general election against BJP Member of Parliament Shatrughan Sinha from the Patna Sahib (Lok Sabha constituency). Amanullah was elected as a member of the Bihar Legislative Assembly in 2010 from the Sahebpur Kamal constituency in Begusarai district as a candidate of the Janata Dal (United) after defeating Rashtriya Janata Dal's Shreenarayan Yadav. She became the Social Welfare minister of Bihar in Nitish Kumar's government and held the portfolio until February 2014 when she resigned from JD(U) citing "governance issues" and "lack of work satisfaction". She joined Arvind Kejriwal's Aam Aadmi Party two days later.

Amanullah is the daughter of former Kishanganj (Lok Sabha constituency) MP Syed Shahabuddin and the wife of senior Bihar cadre IAS officer Afzal Amanullah. Before entering politics she was known for her activism, especially in regard to her use of the Right to Information Act, 2005 to bring out the apathy prevalent in government institutions.

References 

People from Begusarai district
Aam Aadmi Party politicians
Janata Dal (United) politicians
Bihar MLAs 2010–2015
Living people
Year of birth missing (living people)
Aam Aadmi Party candidates in the 2014 Indian general election